Gregory Gerard Evans (born June 28, 1971) is a former American football safety in the National Football League (NFL) for the Buffalo Bills and the Washington Redskins.  He played college football at Texas Christian University.

Evans is currently employed with the City of Dallas Fire and Rescue Department.  He currently holds the rank of captain.  He also holds certifications as a state-certified firefighter and paramedic.  He has been employed with Dallas Fire Rescue since 1999.

1971 births
Living people
People from Daingerfield, Texas
American football safeties
TCU Horned Frogs football players
Buffalo Bills players
Frankfurt Galaxy players
Washington Redskins players